Athletics at the 2019 European Youth Summer Olympic Festival was held at Tofig Bahramov Stadium, Baku, Azerbaijan from 22 to 27 July 2019.

Medalists

Boys

Track

* Medalists who participated in heats only.

Field

Combined

Girls

Track

* Medalists who participated in heats only.

Field

Combined

Medal table

References

External links

2019 European Youth Summer Olympic Festival
European Youth Summer Olympic Festival
2019
2019 European Youth Summer Olympic Festival